Alex Minsky is a retired Marine corporal turned model. At the beginning of his first tour of Afghanistan in 2009, his Humvee hit a roadside bomb and his right leg was amputated. He spent 47 days in a coma with a traumatic brain injury and 17 months in total in a hospital. After his brother died from a drug overdose, he entered a 23-month period of alcohol abuse, and to get out of it, he turned to physical fitness. It was during one of his routine workouts that he was approached by a fashion photographer named Tom Cullis. However, his career didn't start to take off until he was photographed nearly nude by the Los Angeles photographer Michael Stokes.

Personal life

He grew up in Mission Viejo, Orange County, California. Alex is the oldest of four siblings. Minsky is 5′10″, weighs 165 lbs and has a 32" waist. He married in 2018.

Awards
Purple Heart, 2009.

References

Living people
United States Marines
Male models from California
People from Mission Viejo, California
Models with disabilities
1988 births